Events from the year 2000 in Taiwan, Republic of China. This year is numbered Minguo 89 according to the official Republic of China calendar.

Incumbents
 President – Lee Teng-hui, Chen Shui-bian
 Vice President – Lien Chan, Annette Lu
 Premier – Vincent Siew, Tang Fei
 Vice Premier – Liu Chao-shiuan, Yu Shyi-kun

Events

February
 1 February
 The establishment of Coast Guard Administration.
 The establishment of National University of Kaohsiung in Nanzih District, Kaohsiung City.
 25 February – The establishment of National Museum of Marine Biology and Aquarium in Checheng Township, Pingtung County.

March
 18 March – 2000 Republic of China presidential election.
 29 March – The opening of Taipei City Mall in Taipei.
 31 March – The establishment of People First Party.

April
 28 April – 11th Golden Melody Awards at Sun Yat-sen Memorial Hall in Xinyi District, Taipei City.

May
 20 May
 Chen Shui-bian took office as President of the Republic of China.
 Annette Lu took office as Vice President of the Republic of China.
 Tang Fei took office as Premier of the Republic of China.
 Yu Shyi-kun took office as Vice Premier of the Republic of China.
 21 May – The opening of Image Museum of Hsinchu City in East District, Hsinchu City.

July
 15 July – The first Hohaiyan Rock Festival held in Gongliao Township, Taipei County.

August
 1 August
 The opening of National Linkou High School in Linkou Township, Taipei County.
 The upgrade of Shu-Te Institute of Technology in Yanchao Township, Kaohsiung County to Shu-Te University.
 The upgrade of National Kaohsiung Hospitality Management Academy in Siaogang District, Kaohsiung City to National Kaohsiung Hospitality Management Academy.
 18–27 August – Typhoon Bilis.
 31 August – The opening of Xiaonanmen Line of Taipei Metro.

November
 26 November – The opening of Taipei County Yingko Ceramics Museum in Taipei County.

Births
 21 February – Cho I-hsuan, tennis player

References

 
Years of the 20th century in Taiwan